The 1994 Penn Quakers football team represented the University of Pennsylvania in the 1994 NCAA Division I-AA football season. Penn was undefeated and won the Ivy League championship.

Schedule

References

Penn
Penn Quakers football seasons
Ivy League football champion seasons
College football undefeated seasons
Penn Quakers football